Wilhelm Marx House (Wilhelm-Marx-Haus) is a historical high-rise building in the central district of Düsseldorf in Germany. It was one of the first highrise buildings in Germany.

Wilhelm Marx House was finished in 1924 (beginning of the construction was in 1922) and was one of the first skyscrapers in Europe. It is 57 meters high and has 13 floors above ground level. The architect was Wilhelm Kreis.

It was named after Wilhelm Marx, who was mayor of Düsseldorf in the early 20th century and started a programme for the modernisation of the city in that time. This Wilhelm Marx is not the same person as the German Chancellor Wilhelm Marx.

The building was renovated in the 1990s.

Wilhelm Marx House was previously home of the Düsseldorf Stock Exchange and presently includes a theatre, called "JuTA" ("Junges Theater in der Altstadt", or "Young Theatre in the Old Town").

External links 
 
 Marx House at the Official Website of the City of Düsseldorf
 

Buildings and structures in Düsseldorf
Modernist architecture in Germany
Houses completed in 1924